Oyster Bay, New York can refer to:
 Oyster Bay (town), New York
 Oyster Bay (hamlet), New York
 Oyster Bay (inlet), also Oyster Bay Harbor, an inlet on the north shore of Long Island, New York
 South Oyster Bay, a lagoon off the southern shore of Long Island, New York
 Massapequa, New York, which was called South Oyster Bay until late in the 19th century

id:Oyster Bay, New York